The Armenia national ball hockey team has been representing Armenia in the Ball Hockey World Championship since 2013. Is member of the International Street and Ball Hockey Federation (ISBHF).

World Championship

External links 
http://iabha.org/

Ball hockey
Ball hockey